Tianzhen County is a county of Shanxi province, China, bordering Hebei province to the northeast, east and south and Inner Mongolia to the northwest. It is under the administration of Datong City and is the northernmost county-level division of the province.

History

Corruption scandal
In March 2017, various Chinese media have reported that a deputy head of the county's Transportation Management Office, identified as Zhang Ming, was involved in an affair with a married woman, and used 50 people to force the mistress's husband to divorce her. Zhang is reportedly under investigation.

In response, Zhang said he was framed, and the allegations were untrue.

Climate

Notes 
a.The married woman's identity has been released, in various forms, by various news outlets. Beijing Times and Taiwanese news site ETToday identified her as Shi Xiaoli, while China Youth Daily identified her as merely Xiaoli

References

External links

Official website 

County-level divisions of Shanxi
Datong